Butino is the name of several rural localities in Russia.

Modern localities
Butino, Kirov Oblast, a village in Loynsky Rural Okrug of Verkhnekamsky District in Kirov Oblast; 
Butino, Tver Oblast, a village in Kozlovskoye Rural Settlement of Spirovsky District in Tver Oblast

Abolished localities
Butino, Kostroma Oblast, a village in Andreyevsky Selsoviet of Susaninsky District of Kostroma Oblast; abolished on November 5, 2004

References

Notes

Sources